Hoseyn Zehi (also Romanized as Ḩoseyn Zehī, Ḩoseyn Zāhī, and Ḩoseyn-e Zehī; also known as Ḩoseyn-e Zāy, Ḩoseyn Zā’ī, and Husanzai) is a village in Pir Sohrab Rural District, in the Central District of Chabahar County, Sistan and Baluchestan Province, Iran. At the 2006 census, its population was 325, in 54 families.

References 

Populated places in Chabahar County